Khatyn was a village of 26 houses and 157 inhabitants in Belarus, in Lahoysk Raion, Minsk Region, 50 km away from Minsk. On 22 March 1943, almost the entire population of the village was massacred by the Schutzmannschaft Battalion 118 in retaliation for an attack on German troops by Soviet partisans.

The battalion was composed of primarily Ukrainian nationalist Nazi collaborators and assisted by the Dirlewanger Waffen-SS special battalion.

Background
The massacre was not an unusual incident in Belarus during World War II. At least 5,295 Belarusian settlements were burned and destroyed by the Nazis, and often all their inhabitants were killed (some amounting to as many as 1,500 victims) as a punishment for collaboration with partisans. In the Vitebsk region, 243 villages were burned down twice, 83 villages three times, and 22 villages were burned down four or more times. In the Minsk region, 92 villages were burned down twice, 40 villages three times, nine villages four times, and six villages five or more times. Altogether, over 2,000,000 people were killed in Belarus during the three years of Nazi occupation, almost a quarter of the region's population.

On 22 March 1943, a German convoy was attacked by Soviet partisans near Koziri village, 6 km away from Khatyn, resulting in the deaths of four police officers of Schutzmannschaft Battalion 118. Among the dead was Hauptmann Hans Woellke, the battalion's commanding officer.

Massacre
Troops from the Dirlewanger Brigade, a unit mostly composed of criminals recruited for Nazi security warfare tasks, entered the village and drove the inhabitants from their houses and into a shed, which was then covered with straw and set on fire. The trapped people managed to break down the front doors, but in trying to escape, were killed by machine gun fire. Around 149 people, including 75 children under 16 years of age, were killed due to burning, shooting or smoke inhalation. The village was then looted and burned to the ground.

Survivors

Eight inhabitants of the village survived, of whom six witnessed the massacre – five children and an adult.
 Twelve-year-old Anton Iosifovich Baranovsky (1930–1969) was left for dead with wounds in both legs. His injuries were treated by partisans. Five months after the opening of the Memorial, Baranovsky died in unclear circumstances.
 The only adult survivor of the massacre, 56-year-old village smith Yuzif Kaminsky (1887–1973), recovered consciousness with wounds and burns after the killers had left. He supposedly found his burned son, who later died in his arms. This incident was later commemorated with a statue at the Khatyn Memorial.
 Another 12-year-old boy, Alexander Petrovich Zhelobkovich (1930–1994), escaped from the village before the soldiers were able to fully surround it. His mother woke him up and put him on a horse, on which he escaped to a nearby village. After the war, he served in the armed forces and became a reserve lieutenant colonel.
 Vladimir Antonovich Yaskevich (1930–2008) hid in a potato pit 200 meters from his family house. Two soldiers noticed the boy, but spared him. Vladimir noted that they spoke German between themselves, not Ukrainian.
 Sofia Antonovna Yaskevich (later Fiokhina) (1934–2020), Vladimir's sister, hid in the cellar from the early morning of the massacre. As an adult she worked as a typist, and was last reported living in Minsk.
 Viktor Andreevich Zhelobkovich (1934–2020), a seven-year-old boy, survived the fire in the shed under the corpse of his mother. As an adult, he worked at the design office of precise engineering, and was also reported to be living in Minsk.
Two other Khatyn women survived because they were away from the village that day.
 Tatyana Vasilyevna Karaban (1910 – c. 2000s) was visiting relatives in a neighboring village, Seredniaya.
 Sofya Klimovich, a relative of Karaban, was also visiting a nearby village. After the war she worked at the Memorial for several years.

Post-war trials
In 1946, the officer who ordered the massacre, Bruno Pavel, was prosecuted at the Riga Trial and executed. Ivan Melnichenko, the leader of the Dirlewanger unit which committed the massacre, was fatally shot by NKVD agents on 26 February 1946 while resisting arrest. Multiple collaborators who participated in the massacre were tried in the 1960s and 1970s. Some of them were executed.

The commander of one of the platoons of 118th Schutzmannschaft Battalion, former Soviet junior lieutenant Vasyl Meleshko, was tried in a Soviet court and executed in 1975.

The chief of staff of 118th Schutzmannschaft Battalion, former Red Army senior lieutenant Hryhoriy Vasiura, was tried in Minsk in 1986 and found guilty of all his crimes. He was sentenced to death by the verdict of the military tribunal of the Belorussian Military District. Vasiura was executed in 1987.

The case and the trial of the main executioner of Khatyn was not given much publicity in the media; the leaders of the Soviet republics worried about the inviolability of unity between the Belarusian and Ukrainian peoples.

Khatyn Memorial

Khatyn became a symbol of mass killings of the civilian population during the fighting between partisans, German troops, and collaborators. In 1969, it was named the national war memorial of the Byelorussian SSR. Among the best-recognized symbols of the memorial complex is a monument with three birch trees, with an eternal flame instead of a fourth tree, a tribute to the one in every four Belarusians who died in the war. There is also a statue of Yuzif Kaminsky carrying his dying son, and a wall with niches to represent the victims of all the concentration camps, with large niches representing those with more than 20,000 victims. Bells ring every 30 seconds to commemorate the rate at which Belarusian lives were lost throughout the duration of the Second World War.

Part of the memorial is a Cemetery of villages with 185 tombs. Each tomb symbolizes a particular village in Belarus that was torched along with its population.

Among the foreign leaders who have visited the Khatyn Memorial during their time in office are Richard Nixon of the US, Fidel Castro of Cuba, Rajiv Gandhi of India, Yasser Arafat of the PLO, and Jiang Zemin of China.

According to Norman Davies, the Khatyn massacre was deliberately exploited by the Soviet authorities to cover up the Katyn massacre, and this was a major reason for erecting the memorial – it was done in order to cause confusion with Katyn among foreign visitors.

In 2004, the Memorial was renovated. According to 2011 data, the Memorial was in the top ten of the most attended tourist sites in Belarus – that year it was visited by 182,000 people.

See also 
 Come and See, 1985 film about the massacre
 German occupation of Byelorussia during World War II
 Koriukivka massacre
 Ležáky and Lidice
 List of massacres in Belarus
 Michniów
 Oradour-sur-Glane massacre
 Vladimir Katriuk

References

External links 

 Khatyn Museum
 Remembering the Khatyn Massacre by Meilan Solly, Smithsonian (magazine) March 22, 2021
 Catalog of Pins and Medals Commemorating the Khatyn Massacre and Memorial Site
 The Khatyn Massacre in Belorussia: A Historical Controversy Revisited by Per Anders Rudling, from Holocaust and Genocide Studies, Volume 26, Issue 1, Spring 2012, Pages 29–58; Source abstract

1943 in Belarus
1943 murders in the Soviet Union
Belarus in World War II
Genocides in Europe
Eastern Front (World War II)
Ethnic cleansing in Europe
Lahoysk District
March 1943 events
Massacres in 1943
Massacres in Belarus
Massacres in the Soviet Union
Nazi war crimes in Belarus
Reichskommissariat Ostland
The Holocaust in Belarus
Villages in Belarus

be:Вёска Хатынь
de:Massaker von Chatyn
pl:Chatyń